Alexander Raphael (died 1850) was the first British-Armenian to serve in the House of Commons of the United Kingdom. He was returned as a Whig MP from the Irish constituency of County Carlow, at a by-election in June 1835. However the election was challenged on petition and he was unseated on 19 August 1835. Raphael succeeded in re-entering the House of Commons as a Catholic Whig from St Albans in 1847 and retained the seat until his death. Prior to serving in Parliament, he had been Sheriff of London for 1834, where he lost the tip of his left index finger in a fight with a criminal. His father was Edward Raphael who was one of the founders of the Carniac Bank in Madras, India, which opened its doors in 1788.

His legacy is St Raphael's Church in Surbiton, London, which he financed and had built as a family chapel. Completed in 1848, only two years before his death, it was later opened to the public as a Roman Catholic church by his nephew, Edward.

References

Parliamentary Election Results in Ireland, 1801-1922, edited by B.M. Walker (Royal Irish Academy 1978)

James Corbett, A History of St Albans states that Alexander Raphael was a Whig, as does F.W.S. Craig in British Parliamentary Election Results 1832-1885.

External links 
 

Year of birth missing
1850 deaths
Members of the Parliament of the United Kingdom for County Carlow constituencies (1801–1922)
UK MPs 1835–1837
UK MPs 1847–1852
British people of Armenian descent
British Roman Catholics
Whig (British political party) MPs for Irish constituencies
Whig (British political party) MPs for English constituencies
Sheriffs of the City of London